Song Young-jin (16 August 1947 – 16 December 2022) was a South Korean politician. A member of the Unification National Party and later the Democratic Party, he served in the National Assembly from 1992 to 1996 and again from 2000 to 2004.

Song died on 16 December 2022, at the age of 75.

References

1947 births
2022 deaths
South Korean politicians
Democratic Party (South Korea, 2000) politicians
Members of the National Assembly (South Korea)
People from Dangjin